Pterolophia albocincta is a species of beetle in the family Cerambycidae. It was described by Charles Joseph Gahan in 1894. It is known from Somalia, Ethiopia and Kenya.

References

albocincta
Beetles described in 1894